Rashid bin Mohammed bin Rashid Al Maktoum (12 November 1981 – 19 September 2015) was the eldest son of United Arab Emirates Vice President and Prime Minister and Dubai Ruler Sheikh Mohammed bin Rashid Al Maktoum and Sheikha Hind bint Maktoum bin Juma Al Maktoum. He died at age 33 of a heart attack.

Biography
Rashid was one of Mohammed bin Rashid Al Maktoum's many children. He was born on 12 November 1981. Rashid was educated in Dubai at the Rashid School for Boys. He then attended Sandhurst Military Academy in the United Kingdom and graduated in 2002.

Rashid was overlooked from the position of Crown Prince of Dubai. In a confidential memo sent from the U.S. consulate in Dubai back to Washington – published by WikiLeaks – acting consul general David Williams wrote: "It is alleged that Rashid killed an assistant in the Ruler's office, thereby forfeiting his opportunity to be heir." His father Mohammed bin Rashid Al Maktoum appointed his younger brother Hamdan crown prince in 2008.

Rashid was a principal partner or owner in the following listed companies:

 Noor Investment Group, Principal Partner
 Noor Bank, Principal Partner
 United Holdings Group Dubai, Owner
 Zabeel Racing International, Owner
 Dubai Holding Company, Principal Partner

Sport
Rashid was a well-known sports figure in the UAE. He participated in a number of International and local Equestrian Endurance competitions winning a number of laurels. His greatest achievement was winning two gold medals in the 2006 Asian Games 120 km Endurance individual mixed as well as 120 km Endurance Team Mixed events. He owned Zabeel Racing, the Dubai stables where his horses were trained. Rashid led the individual owners list an unprecedented five times with over 428 wins. He was also a football fan; his favourite club was Manchester United.

In January 2006 Rashid was appointed president of the UAE Olympic Committee but he later resigned from his position. He also served as president of Dubai Cultural and Sports Club.

Death
According to the United Arab Emirates state news agency WAM, Rashid died of a heart attack on the morning of 19 September 2015. He was 33 years old. Yemeni media claimed Rashid was killed by Houthi forces in Marib province of Yemen. Other sources claimed that he was a drug user. A three-day mourning period was declared in Dubai upon his death, and the United Arab Emirates flags were flown at half mast. Funeral prayers were held after Maghrib prayers at Zabeel Mosque. His burial took place on the same day in Bur Dubai's Umm Hurair cemetery.

Ancestry

References

1981 births
2015 deaths
Asian Games medalists in equestrian
Emirati princes
Emirati Sunni Muslims
Al-Maktoum, Rashid
Graduates of the Royal Military Academy Sandhurst
Rashid bin Mohammed Al Maktoum
People from Dubai
Rashid School for Boys alumni
Asian Games gold medalists for the United Arab Emirates
Emirati male equestrians
Medalists at the 2006 Asian Games
Sons of monarchs